Anne Madden may refer to:
 Anne Madden (artist)
 Anne Madden (biologist)